The following lists events from the year 2011 in Albania.

Incumbents
 President: Bamir Topi
 Prime Minister: Sali Berisha
 Deputy Prime Minister: Ilir Meta

Events

January
January 21 - Over 20,000 people protest against alleged electoral fraud with 3 people being killed in clashes with police in Tirana. Deputy minister Ilir Meta resigns from his position.
January 22 - Prime Minister Berisha declares his country will not experience a Tunisian-style uprising in response to the protests.
January 23 - Arrest warrants are issued for six members of the republican guard over the deaths of three protesters during the unrest.
January 25 - Opposition leader Edi Rama calls for more protests in the country and demands the international community mediate the political crisis.
January 28 - Over 100,000 supporters of the Socialist Party of Albania, the opposition, mourn the deaths of three protesters during police clashes in anti-government protests, through a two-hour calm procession.

March
March 30th- 3.4 Earthquake in Gjrokastra

April

May

June

July

August

September

October

November

November 30: Death of Leka, Crown Prince of Albania, in Tirana.

December
December 30: New Year's Eve Terrorist Attack On A Hotel In Durrës

Births

Deaths

References

External links

 
Years of the 21st century in Albania
2010s in Albania
Albania
Albania